The Buffalo Bandits are a lacrosse team based in Buffalo, New York playing in the National Lacrosse League (NLL). The 2015 season is their twenty-fourth season in the NLL.

Regular season

Current standings

Game log
Reference:

Playoffs
The post season for the Bandits began as the third best record in the east, qualifying them for the division semifinal. The tone was set early on by the host Rochester Knighthawks, who led 5-2 after one period. The game would be relatively even the rest of the game but the three goal margin from the first was the difference in the game and sent Buffalo back west along the Interstate 90. In what would be his last game for the Bandits and in professional lacrosse, John Tavares registered five assists.

Game log

Roster

Transactions

Trades

Entry Draft
The 2014 NLL Entry Draft took place on September 22, 2014. The Bandits made the following selections:

See also
2015 NLL season

References

Buffalo
Buffalo Bandits seasons
Buffalo Bandits